The tan beret also known as a beige beret has been adopted as official headgear by several special operations forces as a symbol of their unique capabilities.

Afghan National Army
Afghan National Army Special Forces members were awarded a tan beret after successfully completing ANA Special Forces Qualification and serving honorably for two deployment cycles.  All ANA Special Forces candidates were selected from the Afghan National Army Commandos, where they earned a maroon beret for completing the ANA Commando Qualification Course at Camp Morehead, Kabul Province.

Australian Army
Qualified members of the Australian Special Air Service Regiment wear a sand-coloured beret with a metal gold and silver winged dagger badge on a black shield.

Brazilian Army
A sand-coloured beret is worn by Airmobile personnel, mostly concentrated in the 12th Light Infantry Brigade (Airmobile) in the State of São Paulo, regardless of Arm of Service. Berets are worn in the French manner, with Army Badge over the right eye and extra material pulled to the left.

British Army
The sand-coloured beret of the Special Air Service is officially designated the beige beret. The beige beret was worn from 1942 till 1944. In 1944, when the SAS returned to the UK they were forced to adopt the maroon beret of the airborne forces as they became part of that command (see Special Air Service Troops). When the SAS was re-raised in 1947 as 21st SAS Artist Rifles they again wore the maroon beret. In 1956 however the SAS officially adopted the beige beret again, an attempt was made to match the original sand coloured cloth beret from those in the possession of veterans. This proved impossible to do from existing approved cloth colour stocks held by the British authorities, so, as a compromise and with no authorisation for expenditure on a new colour dye the nearest acceptable colour was selected and approved by an all ranks committee of the Regimental Association. In 1958 all SAS personnel switched from maroon to beige. Personnel attached to the regiment also wear this beret but with their own badges in accordance with usual British practice.

Canadian Armed Forces
Only members of Canadian Special Operations Forces Command (CANSOFCOM) wear the tan beret, regardless of whether they wear Army, Navy or Air Force uniform. This includes members of Joint Task Force 2 (JTF2), the Canadian Special Operations Regiment (CSOR), the Canadian Joint Incident Response Unit (CJIRU) and 427 Special Operations Aviation Squadron. The standard berets of Navy, Army and Air Force uniforms are black, green and blue, respectively. See  for details.

French Army
Brown berets were worn by fortress troops assigned to the Maginot Line during the interwar period of the 1920s through the invasion of 1940. It was also later worn by tirailleur units of the Colonial Army in lieu of the Bonnet de Police.

Hungarian Armed Forces
The 2nd Special Operations Brigade has worn tan berets with special ops wings with dagger since 12 October 2018.

Italian Army
Tan berets are worn by the 17º Stormo Incursori, the raiders corp of Italian Air Force. Its primary missions are: raids on aeronautical compounds, Forward Air Control, Combat Controlling, and Combat Search and Rescue. Its origins are in the A.D.R.A  Arditi Distruttori Regia Aeronautica (Air Force Brave Destroyers), a corp of WW2. They were used in little-known missions against bridges and allied airfields in north-Africa after the fall of Tunisia. The only well-known mission reported the destruction with explosive charges of 25 B-17s and the killing of 50 bomber crew members.

Israeli Army
Sand-coloured berets are worn by the Combat Intelligence Collection Corps of the Israel Defense Forces.

New Zealand Army
The sand-coloured beret, winged dagger badge and blue belt are worn by members of the New Zealand Special Air Service and are awarded to personnel who are accepted as members of the unit after passing the arduous selection course and 9 month basic cycle of training.

Norwegian Army
The 2nd Battalion of the Norwegian Army Brigade Nord (North Brigade) uses a sand-coloured beret. However they are not considered special forces, as their role is mechanised infantry.

Royal Malaysia Police

69 Commando of the Royal Malaysia Police adopted the  tan beret as part of their uniform after the beret was conferred by the United Kingdom's 22 SAS to the founding members of 69 Commando (also known as VAT 69 - Very Able Trooper 69) after completing SAS training in 1969. 69 Commando is the only unit in Malaysia wearing the tan beret.
See: Pasukan Gerakan Khas.

Singapore Army
Prior to 1979, all Guardsmen worn the standard army green berets as official headgear. Together with the presentation of a newly designed Cap Badge Backing on 6 April 1979, as well as the issuing of the distinctive khaki berets on 9 June 1994, the special nature of Guardsmen in the Singapore Armed Forces (SAF) were recognised.

Support personnel attached to Guards units continue to wear their parent unit's designated berets coupled with the Guards cap badge backing.

For detailed background, see Guards.

Spanish Army
Spanish Light Infantry Brigade "CANARIAS XVI" uses a sand-coloured beret since April 2011. The BRILCAN, directly subordinated to Canarias General Command, possesses preparation for the aeromobility, combat in population and for the operations in the desert within the framework of the Rapid Action Force that they justify the color of his beret.

See: Brigada de Infantería Ligera CANARIAS XVI.

Swedish Army
The Swedish Home Guard (Hemvärnet) wears a tan beret.

Swiss Armed Forces
All members of the Special Forces Command wear a tan beret with their uniform.

United States Army
On June 14, 2001 the U.S. Army Rangers assigned to the 75th Ranger Regiment were authorized to wear a distinctive tan beret to replace the black berets that had become the army-wide standard.  In the U.S. Army, the tan beret can be worn only by those assigned to the 75th Ranger Regiment, the Airborne and Ranger Training Brigade, or have served with the regiment for at least one year and is still serving within a unit under the U.S. Army Special Operations Command.

See also
Other military berets by color:
Black beret
Green beret, also worn by Special Forces
Maroon beret
Red beret

References

External links

Special forces
Berets